Mercik Peak is a conspicuous peak,  high, located  northeast of Mount Wells, on the ridge descending from the latter, in the Prince Olav Mountains of Antarctica. It was named by the Advisory Committee on Antarctic Names for James E. Mercik, a United States Antarctic Research Program aurora scientist at South Pole Station, winter 1965.

References

Mountains of the Ross Dependency
Dufek Coast